The De Wildt Solar Power Station, is a  50 MW solar power station in South Africa. The power station was developed as is owned by a consortium of five South African independent power producers (IPPs) and investment firms. The energy generated here is sold directly to Eskom, the national electricity utility parastatal company, for integration into the South African grid. A 20-year power purchase agreement (PPA) between the solar farm owners and Eskom governs the sale and purchase of electricity between the two.

Location
The power station is located near the town of Brits, in Madibeng Municipality, in Bojanala District, in the North West Province, of South Africa.

Overview
It is made up of 169,140 photo-voltaic solar panels, capable of generating 50 MW of electricity at maximum capacity. The concession for this project was awarded during the 4th round of the Renewable Energy Independent Power Producer Procurement Programme (REIPPP) of the South African government.

Ownership
The owners of this power station, formed an ad hoc special vehicle  (SPV) company called De Wildt Solar (Pty) Limited, to own, design, build, operate and maintain the solar farm.  The table below illustrates the shareholding in the SPV company.

Construction
The engineering, procurement and construction (EPC) contract was awarded to Cobra Energia, a company based in Spain. The cost of construction is reported as US$92.8 million.

Timeline
Construction started in March 2019. Commercial commissioning was achieved in January 2021.

See also
 List of power stations in South Africa

References

External links
 Official Website

Solar power stations in South Africa
Economy of North West (South African province)
Energy infrastructure completed in 2021
2021 establishments in South Africa
Buildings and structures in North West (South African province)
Bojanala Platinum District Municipality
21st-century architecture in South Africa